Carlos Mario Hoyos Jaramillo (born February 28, 1962) is a retired football defender who was capped 24 times for Colombia between 1985 and 1990. He was an unused substitute for the 1990 World Cup. His club at that time was Atlético Junior.

Career
Hoyos played professional football in Colombia with Deportivo Cali, Atlético Junior and Deportes Quindío. After he retired from playing, he became a football manager and led Itagüi FC, Patriotas Boyacá and Atlético Bucaramanga.

References

External links
 

1962 births
Living people
Colombian footballers
Categoría Primera A players
Deportivo Cali footballers
Atlético Junior footballers
Deportes Quindío footballers
Colombia international footballers
1983 Copa América players
1987 Copa América players
1989 Copa América players
1990 FIFA World Cup players
Association football defenders
Footballers from Medellín
Cúcuta Deportivo managers
Águilas Doradas Rionegro managers
Patriotas Boyacá managers